Ibro is a Bosnian diminutive of the Arabic name Ibrahim and may refer to: Somali nick name for Ibrahim.

Given name
 Ibrahim "Ibro" Biogradlić (1931–2015), retired Bosnian footballer

Other uses
Ibro, Albania, village in Berat County, Albania

References

Arabic masculine given names
Bosnian masculine given names
Turkish masculine given names